Nicola Barile (born in Santa Maria Capua Vetere, February 5, 1962) is an Italian screenwriter, writer and director.
Considered one of the pioneers of animation in Campania, after having worked for several years at the screenplays of the soap-opera Un Posto al Sole, in 2003 he began to devote himself to writing for boys and, the following year, he published his first novel: "The skeletons in wardrobe" published by Tilapia / Colonnese. From this publication the character "Edo, the little prince of Sansereno" came to life, whom will become, a few years later, the protagonist of an animated movie made in co-production with Rai and broadcast on Rai Due.

Biography 
Parallel to his work as an author, he founded Tilapia, a leading production company for cartoons and educational products for children. In the decade 2003–2005 he collaborated at full speed with RAI, signing as a producer or as director the special "The mystery of Vergil's Egg" and "The song of the shepherds". In 2008 Barile wrote and directed an animated short film "Dalla cella alla brace", made together with the prisoners of the Secondigliano Prison, in the context of a cooking course entrusted to Gesco, a consortium of social cooperatives. In 2014 he produced for Peppino Di Capri the cartoon "Champagne" in honor of the 40th anniversary of the famous hit song. In 2015 he followed the direction of the docufilm "Arts and Crafts, Men at Work in Pompeii" presented at the XXVI International exhibition of archaeological cinema in Rovereto, in 2016 he leads the artistic direction of the successful series of commercials of coffee brand Caffè Borbone, signed by Giovanni Calvino, produced by TILE Storytellers, and then, in 2017, he comes back to the direction of the cartoon music video "Ninna nanna di sua Maestà", one of the songs by "Zecchino D'Oro" sung by the Antoniano choir of Bologna. Since 2019 Barile is the CCO of the production company TILE Storytellers.

Documentaries 
Before becoming a pioneer in animation in Campania, he signed numerous subjects and screenplays for documentaries broadcast by Rai. The most famous, often broadcast on the thematic channels such as Rai Cultura and Rai Storia is "The Spouse of Naples" a documentary on the life of Achille Lauro. Numerous, then, the documentaries signed with the CNRS-Center Jean Bérard of Naples presented at the International Exhibition of Rovereto, at the Agon film festival in Athens and at the Salon de la valorisation en sciences humaines et sociales in France.
Recently He signed "Pecunia non Olet", a documentary filmed in Pompeii that opened the 15th Archaeological Festival of Amiens, France.

The little prince of Sansereno 
The success of the first book leads to the publication of further novels, more and more focused on the adventures of "Edo" an imaginary character clearly inspired by Prince Raimondo di Sangro di Sansevero, the famous Neapolitan alchemist. From these stories Rai has created an animated character protagonist of many adventures set in eighteenth-century Naples, reconstructed in 3D. The first special was broadcast on Rai Due in 2012.

The song of the shepherds 
After the success of Edo, Barile has written a new animated feature for Rai, "The song of the shepherds", always tied to the ancient Neapolitan tradition, for which he also curated the direction.

Un posto al sole (cartoon) 
Author, screenwriter and director of the animated television series "UPAS CARTOON" (finalist at the "Pitch me" award of "Cartoons on the bay", international show of television animation, organized by RAI Trade), taken from the soap opera of the same name in collaboration with Rai Tre and Grundy International.

Giga and Stick 
Author and screenwriter of "Giga & Stick to discover of the Cosmos". This is the title of the first cartoon that the Capodimonte Astronomical Observatory of INAF has created in collaboration with the Tilapia. Giga, which has the shape of an elephant and Stick, a mouse, represent the micro and the macro. They live in the internet and in all the "places" through which data, information and knowledge are propagated. They are capable of decomposing and recomposing like data packets. In March 2017 a new evolution of Giga & Stick is selected among the finalists proposals at the "Cartoons on the Bay" in Turin, organized by Rai. The proposal, created with the innovative VR technique, allows users who wear a helmet to find themselves completely catapulted into space.

Healthy leaving means Happy living! 
Author and screenwriter of the series "Healthy leaving means Happy living!" that has as focus instructing through amusing. The contents of which were conceived and produced by the Department of Food Science at the University of Naples "Federico II". Among the different protagonists of the series are Davide Rigatoni, a curious and lively child, and Professor Secondo Federico. The series has had an international success so much that it has also been sold in the Arabic-speaking market, distributed by Your Family Entertainment.

International collaborations 
In 2011 he collaborated with the American screenwriter Roger Rueff, author of The Big Kahuna, at the international Boys & Girls web seriesi, and co-funded by the European Community to raise awareness among European teenagers on some topics, such as nutrition, use of alcohol and drugs and sexual behaviors.

References 

Italian screenwriters
Living people
1962 births
Italian male screenwriters